Kakuda may refer to:

 Kakuda, Miyagi, city in Miyagi, Japan
 Makoto Kakuda (b. 1983), Japanese footballer
 Nobuaki Kakuda (b. 1961), Japanese Seidokaikan - Karate fighter

Japanese-language surnames